First National Financial Corporation ("First National", TSX:FN, TSX:FN.PR.A) is the parent company of First National Financial LP, a Canadian private lending institution based in Toronto, Ontario. First National is among the top three in market share in the mortgage broker distribution channel.

First National is based in Toronto with over 1600 employees and five regional offices throughout Canada, including in Calgary, Vancouver, Halifax, and Montreal.

In 2021, First National announced a record $123.9 billion in mortgages under administration.

History 
In 1988, Stephen J.R. Smith and Moray Tawse opened First National for business with its first office located in Toronto.

In 1991, First National expanded its company to Western Canada and opened a second office in Vancouver. In 1995, First National opened its Halifax office. As the company continued to expand, First National opened another office in Calgary in 2000 and in Montreal in 2008.

In 1991, First National became a CMHC-approved lender in Canada, allowing them to lend directly to borrowers.

In 2001, First National launched Merlin, an online mortgage approval and tracking software system. In 2003, the system expanded to include commercial mortgage administration and investor communications. In 2007, First National introduced My Mortgage, an online mortgage management tool.

In 2006, First National became the first Canadian lender to offer the Canada Mortgage and Housing Corporation (CMHC) insured Interest Only Mortgage, meant to help qualified home buyers to lower their monthly mortgage payments in addition to help their month-to-month cash flow. The Interest Only Mortgage offers the option of paying only interest for the first five or ten years of a mortgage.

On July 16, 2014, First National Financial Corporation announced that its subsidiary First National Financial LP will supplement the Toronto-Dominion Bank with underwriting and fulfillment processing services on mortgages originated through the Toronto-Dominion Bank's residential mortgage broker channel.

In 2006, First National had over $20 billion in mortgages under administration. The following year in 2007, First National had $31.2 billion mortgages under administration, a 37 percent increase from 2006. The increase was mainly due to First National's growing market share in single-family residential mortgages and commercial mortgages. In 2016, First National’s second quarter had a record high of $90.1 billion mortgages under administration.  By the end of that year, First National had a total of $99.4 billion in mortgages under administration. In October 2017, First National Financial Corporation announced it had reached $100 billion in mortgages under administration.

On October 1, 2015, Queen's University’s School of Business changed its name to the Stephen J.R. Smith School of Business in honour of the $50 million donation made by Stephen Smith, Chairman, CEO and Co-founder of First National Financial Corporation.

Effective October 30, 2018, Jason Ellis had fulfilled the role of Chief Operating Officer of First National Financial LP. This appointment came as the company continues to grow. Jason Ellis has been with First National since 2004, overseeing the Treasury and Capital Markets department and helped managed the company's relationships with investors. 

On June 19, 2019, the chairman and CEO of First National Financial LP, Stephen Smith, was inducted into the Canadian Business Hall of Fame.

In January 2022. First National Financial Corporation announced the appointments of Stephen Smith as executive chairman of the board and Jason Ellis as president, chief executive officer, and director.

Holdings
In 2017, First National administered $101.6 billion in mortgages, a 2% increase over 2017. 81% of its mortgages are insured by the Canadian Mortgage and Housing Corporation; 13% are conventional single family residential homes; and 6% are multi-unit residences and commercial spaces.

In 2018, First National's revenue grew 10% to $1.2 billion with $106.2 billion in mortgages under administration.

In 2020, First National had $118.7 billion mortgages under administration and $1.38 billion in revenue. 

In 2021, First National's mortgages under administration grew to $123.9 billion.

As of October 2022, First National's mortgages under administration had grown to $129.3 billion.

Parent and subsidiaries
First National Financial Corporation is the parent company. First National Financial LP is the subsidiary that underwrites and services the mortgages. First National Mortgage Investment Fund is the investment fund for these mortgages. The First National Mortgage Investment Trust backs the short-term mortgages that are originated by First National Financial LP.

Credit agency ratings

References

Companies based in Toronto
Mortgage lenders of Canada